Dalai Beldiri is an album by the Tuvan trio Yat-Kha. It was released internationally in 1999. The album title translates as "the confluence of the seas."

The band supported the album with a North American tour.

Production
The album was produced by Lu Edmonds. It mixed rock styles with Tuvan throat singing. Among the instruments used were the morin khuur and bass shanzi. Albert Kuvezin, Aldyn-ool Sevek, and Zhenya Tkach'v sang on Dalai Beldiri. Sevek employed the sygyt whistling style; Kuvezin sang bass. Kuvezin's guitar playing was influenced by Deep Purple, Led Zeppelin, and Jimi Hendrix.

Critical reception

The Washington Post wrote that "most of the songs on Dalai Beldiri have traditional roots, but they have been rearranged by Kuvezin to combine Tuvan vocal styles and instruments in non-traditional ways with Western pop instruments added in discreet but helpful ways." The Vancouver Sun called "Sodom i Gomora" "a masterpiece," writing that "Tkach'v's haunting voice takes the lead here—the vocal is low and hypnotic, reminiscent of Latin church chanting, with Kuvezin providing a deep background rumble."

The Record determined that "Kuvezin's mixture of original and traditional Tuvan music includes some notable Japanese, aboriginal and 'worldbeat' influences that enlivens the music." The Chicago Tribune concluded that the trio "actually heightens the extraordinary sound of its music with tasteful, imaginative doses of Western drums, guitars and other electric instruments." Miami New Times praised "Charash Karaa", and advised: "Think of a Tibetan monk crooning Bacharach at a karaoke bar in Kabul, and you come within spitting distance of this wonderful and oddly touching slab of sheer testosterone."

AllMusic wrote that the album "offers a dynamic take on traditional Tuvan instrumentals and vocalizations." The Plain Dealer deemed it the 10th best album of 1999. In 2008, The Observer listed Dalai Beldiri as one of the 50 "Essential CDs from Around the World".

Track listing

References

1999 albums
Throat singing